Anupam Ghatak was one of the most important composers of Bengali music, particularly for films. He is best known for the Bengali film Agni Pariksha (1954).

References 

Bangladeshi film score composers
Year of death missing
Place of birth missing
Place of death missing
Bengali musicians
Musicians from West Bengal